Lewis Ludington  (June 25, 1786 – September 3, 1857) was a real estate developer who helped settle Columbus, Wisconsin.

Personal life 

Ludington's father, Henry Ludington of the Ludington family, was a soldier in the French and Indian War. Henry married his cousin Abigail on May 1, 1760. They had twelve children, all born in Kent, New York (then known as Fredericksburgh). Lewis was youngest, born on June 25, 1786. His sister, Sybil Ludington, was the oldest and born on April 5, 1761.

Ludington was partners with his brother Frederick in a store near their home in Kent, New York.

Settling Columbus, Wisconsin 

Ludington entered into a deal with Elbert Dickason to improve land in Wisconsin Territory. Dickason built a cabin on this land acreage along the Crawfish River and dammed up the river for a sawmill and gristmill. Dickason was unable to meet his payments to Ludington and Ludington took back the property.  

Ludington's Plat was recorded on November 11, 1844 a plot of nine blocks,  and other additions were recorded through 1850.

References

Sources

Further reading

External links 

1786 births
1857 deaths
People from Carmel, New York
People from Kent, New York
People from Columbus, Wisconsin
Businesspeople from Wisconsin
Businesspeople from New York (state)
American city founders
19th-century American businesspeople
Ludington family